Thomas "Tom" Hockenhull (birth unknown – death unknown) was an English professional rugby league footballer who played in the 1890s and 1900s.

Playing career

International honours
Tom Hockenhull won a cap for England while at Warrington in 1906 against Other Nationalities, in the same match as Warrington teammate Jackie Fish broke a leg.

County Honours
Tom Hockenhull made 3 appearances for Lancashire, 2 in the 1904/5 season and one in 1906/7.

Club career

Tom Hockenhull made 194 appearances, scoring 40 tries, kicking 7 goals and dropping one goal for 136 points.

Tom Hockenhull score 3 hat-tricks of tries:
the first in a 20–0 win over Batley at Wilderspool on 16 January 1904.
in a 52–0 win over Liverpool on 18 February 1907, he also kicked one of the only two conversions as Warrington scored 16 tries.
on 16 March 1907 in a 34-9 Challenge Cup win over Batley at Wilderspool.

In the 1906/7 season he scored 16 tries.

Tom Hockenhull was club captain for the 1907/8 season, but did not play a match that season.

Note
Tom Hockenhull's surname is variously spelt with a u as Hockenhull, and with an a as Hockenhall,

References

External links
Statistics at wolvesplayers.thisiswarrington.co.uk

England national rugby league team players
English rugby league players
Lancashire rugby league team players
Place of birth missing
Place of death missing
Rugby league centres
Rugby league five-eighths
Rugby league halfbacks
Rugby league wingers
Warrington Wolves players
Year of birth missing
Year of death missing